Forellenbach may refer to following rivers of Germany:

 Forellenbach (Eger) of Bavaria, tributary of the Eger
 Forellenbach (Vils) of Bavaria, tributary of the Vils
 Forellenbach (Weser) of North Rhine-Westphalia, tributary of the Weser